is a passenger railway station in the city of Shibukawa, Gunma, Japan, operated by the East Japan Railway Company (JR East).

Lines

Station layout
The station has a single side platform and a single island platform connected to the station building by a footbridge; however, only one side of the island platform is in use. The station is unattended.

Platforms

History
Shikishima Station opened on 31 March 1924. Upon the privatization of the Japanese National Railways (JNR) on 1 April 1987, it came under the control of JR East. A new station building was completed in March 2003.

Surrounding area
Shikishima Onsen
Akagi Post Office

See also
 List of railway stations in Japan

External links

 Station information (JR East) 

Railway stations in Gunma Prefecture
Railway stations in Japan opened in 1924
Stations of East Japan Railway Company
Jōetsu Line
Shibukawa, Gunma